Wadih El Safi (born Wadih Francis; November 1, 1921 – October 11, 2013) was a Lebanese singer and composer. He was a Lebanese icon and the forefather of the country's musical culture. He was the longest singer in production, seventy-five years in the singing profession. He was the number one singer of his era. He was known amongst his peers to have incarnated and raised the ceiling of all the singing styles and music of that era and added his own intricate new styles and genres to the existing national musical and singing heritage. He is the reference to every new singer and the example to follow for generations to come. Born in Niha, Lebanon, Wadih El Safi started his artistic journey at the age of sixteen when he took part in a singing contest held by Lebanese Radio and was chosen the winner of all categories among 40 other competitors.

Style and Career
Wadih El Safi being a classically trained tenor is not a verified fact since none of his known works provide proof of classical singing techniques. He has been known for singing in the belting school class, and his phonation is a testimonial of this practice. This is further confirmed in what arguably is his most famous song "Lebnan Ya Ote'et Sama" ("لبنان يا قطعة سما" in Arabic, specifically Lebanese dialect) in which his voice shifts to the so-called Falsetto or more widely recognized today as the "Voce Piena Testa" or the full head register on the second transition "Secondo passagio" around "EB4" note above middle "C4" not overlapping "F4", meaning that his voice falls in the Baritone categorization rather than a tenor precisely a lyric baritone which is often linked to these transition areas. El Safi has no record for singing the "B4" and "C5" tenors' famous "High C" which are the characteristic signature of a tenor's laryngeal mechanism (constriction of the pharynx ) even though many of his age did. He was a classically trained tenor. He gained national recognition when, at seventeen, he won a vocal competition sponsored by Radio Lebanon. El Safi began composing and performing songs that drew upon his rural upbringing and love of traditional melodies, blended with an urban sound, and creating a new style of modernized Lebanese folk music.

In 1947, El Safi traveled to Brazil where he remained until 1950. El Safi toured the world, singing in many languages, including Arabic, French, Portuguese and Italian, accompanied by his son George.

Songs and recordings

Wadih El Safi has sung over 5000 songs. He is well-known for his mawawil (an improvised singing style) of 'Ataba, Mijana, and Abu el Zuluf. He has performed and recorded with many well-known Lebanese musicians such as Fairouz, and Sabah.

Health problems and death
In 1990, Wadih El Safi underwent open-heart surgery with the support of the Syrian government. In 2012, he broke his leg and had to have surgery to mend the fracture. After the surgery, his health deteriorated rapidly. In 2013, he was admitted to hospital, suffering from pulmonary consolidation. On October 11, 2013, he fell ill at his son's home and was rushed to the Bellevue Medical Center where he died. His funeral was held at Saint George Maronite Cathedral, Beirut on October 14, 2013.

Tribute
On November 1, 2016, Google celebrated his 95th birthday with a Google Doodle.

Discography

As performer
Best of Wadi – Vol. 1 (EMI, 1999)
Best of Wadi – Vol. 2
Best of Wadi – Vol. 3
Inta Omri (2000)
The Two Tenors: Wadi Al Safi & Sabah Fakhri (Ark 21, 2000)
Wadih El-Safi and José Fernandez (Elef Records)
Wetdallou Bkheir
Rouh ya zaman al madi atfal qana
"W Kberna" Duet with Najwa Karam (2002)
Chante Le Liban
Wadi El Safi / Legends Of The 20th Century
Mersal El Hawa
Mahrajan Al Anwar
Youghani Loubnan
Ajmal El Aghani

As composer
Cantiques de l'Orient (Harmonia Mundi Fr., 1996)
Psaumes Pour Le 3ème Millénaire (Angel Records, 2002)

As sideman
Music of Arabia, Hanaan and her ensemble. Request Records (New Rochelle, New York) SRLP 8083 (as Wadih El-Saffi on oud)

See also 

List of Lebanese people
Lebanon
Fairuz
Sabah
Zajal

References

External links
 

1921 births
2013 deaths
20th-century Lebanese male singers
Lebanese composers
Lebanese songwriters
Lebanese Maronites
People from Chouf District
Lebanese oud players
Singers who perform in Classical Arabic
Performers of Christian music in Arabic